In Case of Emergency is an American half-hour sitcom television series shown on ABC in the United States. The series follows a group of high school acquaintances whose lives have not turned out as they hoped.  It premiered on January 3, 2007, at 9:30 pm and ended on April 11, 2007. The pilot episode was directed by Jon Favreau and the cast included Jonathan Silverman, David Arquette, Lori Loughlin, Kelly Hu, and Greg Germann.

Although ABC gave early renewal notices to several of its series on March 21, 2007, In Case of Emergency was not one of them. 

On April 12, 2007, ABC announced that the show had been officially cancelled, leaving one episode unaired, which has since been broadcast internationally.

Cast and characters

Series regulars
 Jonathan Silverman as Harry Kennison (captain of the debate team), now a frustrated greeting-card writer
 David Arquette as Jason Ventress (voted most likely to succeed), now under investigation for a corporate scandal and volunteering at a hospital
 Greg Germann as Sherman Yablonsky (competitive eating club '84-'87), now a self-obsessed, formerly obese, disgraced diet guru
 Kelly Hu as Kelly Lee (former valedictorian), now working at a Korean massage parlor
 Lori Loughlin as Dr. Joanna Lupone, a doctor with whom Jason falls in love, despite her being engaged
 Jackson Bond as Dylan Kennison, Harry's son, Nicholas Roget-King played the role in the pilot.

Recurring characters
 Leigh-Allyn Baker as Maureen, Harry's ex-wife
 Natsuko Ohama as Madam, Kelly's boss
 Jane Seymour as Donna Ventress, Jason's mom
 David Norona as Paul, Jason's lawyer and, unbeknownst to him, Joanna's fiancé
 Maree Cheatham as Elizabeth Yablonsky, Sherman's mom
 Sara Erikson as Summer, a stripper who befriends Sherman
 Lee Reherman as Frank, Kelly's cop boyfriend
 George Sharperson as Omar, Sherman's assistant
 Gary 'G. Thang' Johnson as Officer G Thang, Frank's partner

Notable guests
 David Carradine as Guru Danny, Stephanie Yablonsky's new spiritual leader
 James Hong as Mr. Lee, Kelly's dad
 Jimmy Kimmel as himself
 Leslie Sykes as herself
 Emily Kuroda as Mrs. Tuckman, a friend of Donna's
 Penny Balfour as Moonblossom, a member of Guru Danny's ashram
 Louis Lombardi as Todd, a security guard at the hospital

Episodes

Ratings
Seasonal ratings based on average total viewers per episode of In Case of Emergency on ABC:

References

External links
 
 Press release for In Case of Emergency
 The Futon Critic Show Watch: In Case of Emergency

American Broadcasting Company original programming
2007 American television series debuts
2007 American television series endings
2000s American sitcoms
Television series by ABC Studios
English-language television shows